Lissewege is a village and a subdivision in the municipality of Bruges, Belgium. Lissewege also includes Zeebrugge and Zwankendamme.

See also
West Flanders

Gallery

Sub-municipalities of Bruges
Populated places in West Flanders